Imitomyiini is a tribe of flies in the family Tachinidae.

Genera
Imitomyia Townsend, 1912
Proriedelia Mesnil, 1953
Riedelia Mesnil, 1942

References

Brachycera tribes
Dexiinae
Diptera of North America
Diptera of Asia
Diptera of Africa
Diptera of Europe